Queens Village is a station on the Long Island Rail Road's Main Line, located between 218th Street and Springfield Boulevard, in the Queens Village neighborhood of Queens, New York City. It has two side platforms along the four-track line, and is served by Hempstead Branch trains. Just east of the station is Queens Interlocking, a universal interlocking that splits the four-track line into two parallel two-track lines—the Main Line and Hempstead Branch—and controls the junction with the spur to Belmont Park. The station is elevated and the tracks leading in and out are on raised ground and only above the road at intersections.

History

Between March and November 1837, the current site of Queens Village station was the site of an early Brooklyn and Jamaica Railroad station named Flushing Avenue station then renamed DeLancey Avenue station and later named Brushville station until it was moved to what is today 212nd Street, the site of the former Bellaire station, which was used to serve Ben Lane's Hotel. By 1871, a new station was originally installed across Jericho Turnpike from the estate of Colonel A.M. Wood which was on the northwest corner of Springfield Boulevard. The estate was named "Inglewood," and the new station which resulted in the closing of the Brushville-Ben Lane's station was named for this estate.

Queens Village station originally opened at ground level as Queens station in 1879 (some sources say 1881). The original station house contained a sign with the distance to Long Island City and Greenport stations. The station house was moved to a private location as a new one was being built as part of a grade elimination project, and opened on September 24, 1924. It was then renamed "Queens Village."  On October 30, 2013, the LIRR unveiled a renovated station, with passenger elevators, improved lighting, security cameras and a repainted building.

Station layout
The station has two high-level side platforms, both of which are eight cars long and are served by a passenger elevator and stairs. Platform A has the station's only station house, a two-story building. The two middle tracks, not next to either platform, are used by the Port Jefferson, Ronkonkoma, Oyster Bay, and Montauk branch trains.

A non-powered storage track is south of the south platform. The Queens Village Freight Yard is located just west of the station, and consists of three tracks. It is used by the LIRR for maintenance and storage, and was sporadically utilized by LIRR freight customers, as well, before the New York and Atlantic Railway assumed freight service operations.

Services 
Queens Village station is primarily served by Hempstead Branch trains. Port Jefferson Branch train 1625 from Huntington to Atlantic Terminal stops at the station on weekday mornings, although this stop is not shown in the printed Port Jefferson Branch timetable.

References

External links

QUEENS Interlocking (The LIRR Today)
 Springfield Boulevard entrance from Google Maps Street View
 Station House from Google Maps Street View (Exterior)
Platforms from Google Maps Street View
Waiting room/ Station house from Google Maps Street View (Interior)
https://www.newsday.com/long-island/transportation/lirr-elmont-station-ubs-arena-1.35311878

Long Island Rail Road stations in New York City
Railway stations in Queens, New York
Railway stations in the United States opened in 1879
1879 establishments in New York (state)